Periamet, natively spelt as Periyamedu, is one of the most important neighborhoods in North Chennai, a metropolitan city in Tamil Nadu, India

Location

Periamet is located near Chennai Central Railway Station

Surroundings

Periamet is known for commercial leather hub. It has many leather trading offices and leather shoe shops. Proximity to Chennai Central Railway Station makes this place famous and hence many hotels and lodges are operating successfully. The commercial activity and footfall is also increased due to Nehru Stadium which often hosts sports and games at national & international level. 

Periamet Mosque is very famous in Chennai.

Star Akbar Milk is a very famous wholesale Milk / Milk products dealer in Periyamet.

Transportation

Many number of buses ply through Periamet, and Chennai Central Railway Station and Egmore are very near to Periamet.

Notes

References

Neighbourhoods in Chennai